Ian Ralph Smith (born 15 February 1957) is an English former professional footballer who played for Tottenham Hotspur, Rotherham United, Bishop's Stortford and represented England at schoolboy and youth level.

Playing career
Smith joined Tottenham Hotspur as an apprentice in April 1974. The full back went on to make two first team appearances for the Lilies in 1975. He transferred to Rotherham United in June 1976 where he featured in four matches. Smith went on to have a spell at non-league Bishops Stortford.

Post-football career
Smith became assistant academy director at Ipswich Town. He left the Portman Road club by mutual agreement in April 2004.

References

External links
 Smith at Tottenham Hotspur

1957 births
Living people
Footballers from Rotherham
English footballers
English Football League players
Tottenham Hotspur F.C. players
Rotherham United F.C. players
Bishop's Stortford F.C. players
Association football fullbacks